Lionel Manuel, Jr. (born April 13, 1962) is a former American college and professional football player who was  a wide receiver. He was drafted in the 7th round (171st pick overall) of the 1984 NFL Draft by the New York Giants, and played seven seasons in the NFL.

Early life
Manuel was born in Los Angeles, California and attended Bassett High School. He played college football at Citrus College before transferring to the University of the Pacific where he played wide receiver and running back for the Pacific Tigers.

Professional career
The 5'11, 180-lb wide receiver was drafted in the 7th round of the 1984 NFL draft by the New York Giants, and played in seven NFL seasons. Manuel spent his entire career with the Giants (1984–1990), including the XXI Giants Super Bowl Team when they beat the Denver Broncos 39-20. His peak performance was during the 1988 season, when he caught 65 passes for 1,029 yards and scored four touchdowns.

Manuel's career ended after several injuries in the 1990 season when he played under Head Coach Bill Parcells. The Giants finished the 1990 season 13–3, and won the Super Bowl XXV against the Buffalo Bills 20–19. Parcells waived Manuel in December 1990, citing Manuel's poor attitude after losing his starting position. Manuel then signed with the Buffalo Bills as a free agent but was waived due to injuries and did not play for the team. Manuel played European football with the Barcelona Dragons before retiring in 1993.

Life after the NFL
Manuel went on to coach several college football teams including The LaVerne Leopards, and later became a professional chef and restaurateur after attending the Scottsdale Culinary Institute. Manuel worked as a high school varsity coach in Fontana, California.
Manuel was inducted into the University of the Pacific Hall of Fame in 2012.

See also
History of the New York Giants (1979-1993)

References

External links
 
 Griddle replaces gridiron

1962 births
Living people
People from Rancho Cucamonga, California
Sportspeople from Chandler, Arizona
Sportspeople from San Bernardino County, California
American football wide receivers
Pacific Tigers football players
New York Giants players
Players of American football from California